Myc box-dependent-interacting protein 1, also known as Bridging Integrator-1 and Amphiphysin-2 is a protein that in humans is encoded by the BIN1 gene.

This gene encodes several isoforms of a nucleocytoplasmic adaptor protein, one of which was initially identified as a MYC-interacting protein with features of a tumor suppressor.

Isoforms that are expressed in the central nervous system may be involved in synaptic vesicle endocytosis and may interact with dynanim, synaptojanin, endophilin, and clathrin.

Isoforms that are expressed in muscle and ubiquitously expressed isoforms localize to the cytoplasm and nucleus and activate a caspase-independent apoptotic process.

Studies in mouse suggest that this gene plays an important role in cardiac muscle development. Alternate splicing of the gene results in ten transcript variants encoding different isoforms. Aberrant splice variants expressed in tumor cell lines have also been described.

Clinical significance
In humans, mutations in BIN1 have been associated with skeletal myopathies including centronuclear myopathy causing muscle weakness and myotonic dystrophy causing progressive muscle wasting, myotonia, cataracts, and heart conduction defects.  An association has also been found between BIN1 mutations and Alzheimer's disease.  Knockdown of BIN1 produces a cardiomyopathy phenotype in zebrafish, and in sheep BIN1 may be responsible for the loss of T-tubules seen in heart failure.

Interactions
BIN1 has been shown to interact with Phospholipase D1, SNX4 and PLD2.

References

Further reading

External links